Brian Birch (born 9 April 1938) is an English former footballer who played for the majority of his career at Bolton Wanderers. He played mainly as an outside right.

Birch made his debut for Bolton at the age of 16 in the autumn of 1954 but did not make the regular first team until the 1957–58 season. He was an ever-present in Bolton's victorious FA Cup run. He remained a regular up to the 1961–62 season but was pushed out of the team by the arrival of Francis Lee. Staying on the fringes for three more years he finally made the short journey across Lancashire to Rochdale, where he remained for three more years before moving into non-league football.

Birch was a schoolboy international, and was capped by England at youth level.

Birch is the grandfather of Canadian footballer Will Johnson.

References

1938 births
Living people
English footballers
Association football wingers
English Football League players
Bolton Wanderers F.C. players
Rochdale A.F.C. players
Footballers from Southport
FA Cup Final players